InsideOut US is the stateside division of the German record label InsideOut Music.  It specializes in progressive rock and progressive metal.  It is based in Pittsburgh, Pennsylvania.

See also
 List of record labels

External links 
 InsideOut Germany website

American record labels
Progressive rock record labels
Companies based in Pittsburgh